The Pantami Stadium is a 12,000 capacity multi-purpose stadium at the Pantami district of Gombe, Gombe State, Nigeria. It is used mostly for the training of Gombe United F.C and football matches but it is also employed for state and national ceremonial events of many kinds, such as religious, political and social event. It is the official home stadium of Gombe United F.C.  and has been considered one of the most modern sport centres in the country. It was reconstructed in 2010.

The structure boast of three major facilities which accommodate the synthetic football pitch, a tartan track for athletics and a gym built to promote and enhance sports development in the state

References

External links
Gombe UTD set to move into new stadium

Football venues in Nigeria
Gombe State
Sports venues completed in 2010
21st-century architecture in Nigeria